The Archdiocese of Luanda is the oldest Roman Catholic archdiocese in Angola.

The Church of Our Lady of Remedies (Igreja de Nossa Senhora dos Remédios) is in Luanda and it was built in 1628. It replaced the former Antiga Catedral de Nossa Senhora da Conceição as episcopal see.

History 
The diocese was founded in 1596 as the Diocese of São Paulo de Loanda alias Angola e Congo (Angola in Congo), on territory split off from the then Roman Catholic Diocese of São Salvador da Congo (now Roman Catholic Diocese of Mbanza Congo.

...
 
It was elevated to its current form on 4 September 1940. It is based in the capital, Luanda.

Since the death of Archbishop Damião António Franklin, the 21st man to hold that position, on 28 April 2014, the seat is occupied by Filomeno do Nascimento Vieira Dias.

Statistics 
As of 2004, The archdiocese was home to approximately 4.84 million people, approximately 3.06 million of them being Roman Catholic (63.1%). There are approximately 150 priests serving the over 3 million Catholics.

Leadership 
Bishops of São Paulo de Loanda/ Angola e Congo (1596 - 1940)
 Miguel Rangel, O.F.M. Cap. (20 May 1596 Appointed - 16 August 1602 Died)
 Antonio de Santo Estevão, O.P. (15 July 1604 Appointed - April 1608 Died)
 Manuel Baptista Soares, O.F.M. (4 May 1609 Appointed - April 1620 Died) 
 Simon Mascarenhas, O.F.M. (15 February 1621 Appointed - 13 October 1624 Died) 
 Francisco de Soveral, O.S.A. (8 February 1627 Appointed - 5 January 1642 Died) 
 Pedro Sanches Farinha (22 June 1671 Appointed - 3 November 1671 Died) 
 Antonio do Espirito Santo, O.C.D. (14 November 1672 Appointed - 12 January 1674 Died) 
 Manuel da Natividade, O.F.M. (2 December 1675 Appointed - 8 December 1685 Died) 
 João Franco de Oliveira (9 June 1687 Appointed - 9 January 1692 Appointed, Archbishop of São Salvador da Bahia) 
 José de Oliveira, O.S.A. (19 July 1694 Appointed - 9 September 1700 Resigned) 
 Luis Simões Brandão (6 February 1702 Appointed - 24 February 1720 Resigned) 
 Manuel a Santa Catharina, O. Carm. (20 March 1720 Appointed - 1 November 1731 Died) 
 Antônio de Nossa Senhora do Desterro Malheiro, O.S.B. (3 September 1738 Appointed - 15 December 1745 Appointed, Bishop of São Sebastião do Rio de Janeiro) 
 Manoel de Santa Ines Ferreira, O.C.D. (15 December 1745 Appointed - 6 August 1770 Appointed, Archbishop of São Salvador da Bahia) 
 Luis da Anunciação Azevedo, O.P. (17 June 1771 Appointed - 8 November 1784 Resigned) 
 Alexandre da Sagrada Familia Ferreira da Silva, O.F.M. (14 February 1785 Appointed - 23 November 1787 Resigned) 
 Luiz de Brito Homem (17 December 1791 Appointed - 24 May 1802 Confirmed, Bishop of São Luís do Maranhão) 
 Joaquim Maria Mascarenhas Castello Branco (20 December 1802 Confirmed - April 1807 Resigned) 
 João Damasceno Da Silva Póvoas (19 December 1814 Confirmed - 21 February 1826 Died) 
 Sebastião da Anunciação Gomes de Lemos, O.C.D. (16 April 1846 Confirmed - 1848 Resigned) 
 Joaquim Moreira Reis, O.S.B. (28 September 1849 Confirmed - 10 March 1857 Resigned) 
 Manuel de Santa Rita Barros, T.O.R. (23 March 1860 Confirmed - 3 January 1862 Died) 
 José Lino de Oliveira (21 December 1863 Appointed - 1 July 1871 Resigned) 
 Tommaso Gomes de Almeida (4 August 1871 Appointed - 22 September 1879 Appointed, Auxiliary Bishop of Goa) 
 José Sebastião d’Almeida Neto, O.F.M. (22 September 1879 Confirmed - 9 August 1883 Confirmed, Patriarch of Lisbon)
 Antonio Tomas da Silva Leitão e Castro (27 March 1884 Appointed - 1 June 1891 Appointed, Coadjutor Bishop of Lamego) 
 Antonio Dias Ferreira (1 June 1891 Appointed - 7 March 1901 Resigned) 
 Antonio José Gomes Cardoso (23 July 1901 Appointed - 12 August 1904 Died) 
 Antonio Barbosa Leão (2 May 1906 Confirmed - 19 December 1907 Appointed, Bishop of Faro {Algarve}) 
 João Evangelista de Lima Vidal (29 April 1909 Confirmed - 9 December 1915 Appointed, Auxiliary Bishop of Lisboa {Lisbon}) 
 Moisés Alves de Pinho, C.S.Sp. (7 April 1932 Appointed - 4 September 1940)
Archbishops of Luanda (since 1940)
 Moisés Alves de Pinho, C.S.Sp. (4 September 1940 - 17 November 1966 Retired)
 Manuel Nunes Gabriel, Coadjutor Archbishop (13 February 1962 - 17 November 1966)
 Manuel Nunes Gabriel (17 November 1966 Succeeded - 19 December 1975 Resigned) 
 Eduardo André Muaca, Coadjutor Archbishop (10 August - 19 December 1975)
 Eduardo André Muaca (19 December 1975 Succeeded - 31 August 1985 Resigned) 
 Alexandre do Nascimento (16 February 1986 Appointed - 23 January 2001 Retired) 
 Damião António Franklin (23 January 2001 Appointed - 28 April 2014 Died) 
 Filomeno do Nascimento Vieira Dias (8 December 2014 Appointed - present)

Auxiliary bishops
Eduardo André Muaca † (1970-1973), appointed Bishop of Malanje 
Zacarias Kamwenho (1974-1975), appointed Bishop of Novo Redondo
Paulino Fernandes Madeca † (1983-1984), appointed Bishop of Cabinda
Pedro Luís Guido Scarpa, O.F.M. Cap. † (1983-1990), appointed Bishop of Ndalatando
Serafim Shyngo-Ya-Hombo, O.F.M. Cap. (1990-1992), appointed Bishop of Mbanza Congo
Damião António Franklin † (1992-2001), appointed Archbishop here
Anastácio Kahango, O.F.M. Cap. (1998-2013)
Filomeno do Nascimento Vieira Dias (2003-2005), appointed Bishop of Cabinda
Zeferino Zeca Martins, S.V.D. (2012-2018), appointed Archbishop of Huambo

Suffragan dioceses 

 Diocese of Cabinda
 Diocese of Caxito
 Diocese of Mbanza Congo
 Diocese of Sumbe
 Diocese of Viana

References

External links
 Luanda on the Catholic Hierarchy
 GCatholic.org with incumbent biography links

Archdiocese of Luanda
1596 establishments in Africa
Religious organizations established in the 1590s
Roman Catholic dioceses in Angola
Catholic Church in Angola
Roman Catholic dioceses established in the 16th century